Outside the Law is a 1956 American film noir crime film directed by Jack Arnold and starring Ray Danton, Leigh Snowden and Grant Williams.

Plot
A government agent's son, an ex-juvenile delinquent, is given the chance to prove himself when paroled from prison. He's given a mission to join thermy to break up an international counterfeiting ring involving an ex-Army friend. He has to woo his friend's girl and extract information from her.

Cast
 Ray Danton as John Conrad, alias Johnny Salvo
 Leigh Snowden as Maria Craven
 Grant Williams as Don Kastner
 Onslow Stevens as Chief Agent Alec Conrad
 Raymond Bailey as Philip Bormann
 Judson Pratt as Agent Saxon
 Jack Kruschen as Agent Pill Schwartz 
 Floyd Simmons as Agent Harris
 Mel Welles as Milo
 Alexander Campbell as Warden Lewis
 Karen Verne as Mrs. Pulenski
 Maurice Doner as Mr. Pulenski
 Jess Kirkpatrick as Bill MacReady
 Arthur Hanson as Agent Parker
 Richard H. Cutting as Agent Pomeroy
 George E. Mather as Bus Station Attendant
 Amapola Del Vando as Mama Gomez

See also
 List of American films of 1956

References

External links

1956 films
Film noir
1956 crime drama films
American crime drama films
Universal Pictures films
1950s English-language films
American black-and-white films
1950s American films